Master Sergeant Eric Roy England (April 15, 1933 – April 7, 2018) was a sniper for the United States Marine Corps 3rd Marine Division during the Vietnam War. He had 98 confirmed kills with many more unconfirmed. Joining the U.S. Marine Corps (USMC) in 1950, England was a Nationals rifle shooting champion by age 19 in 1952, and a long-range champion by 1968. He received his first competitive training in USMC bootcamp from his cousin, Dr. James Harry Turner, at that time a Marine weapons instructor. This led to a 24-year career on the USMC rifle team, winning national and international competitions as participant and coach.

Although little known outside of sniper circles, England was highly respected, and was the subject of the book Phantom of Phu Bai, written by Dr. J. B. Turner. Carlos Hathcock was once quoted as saying, "Eric is a great man, a great shooter, and a great Marine". A sculpture in England's honor was erected at the county courthouse in Union County, Georgia, in 2006. Guest speakers included former Governor of Georgia and U.S. Senator Zell Miller, a former Marine, and a cousin of England; and Maj. Edward James Land, USMC, (ret.), Carlos Hathcock's commanding officer and occasional fellow sniper in Vietnam. Senator Zell Miller, author, news commentator, former Marine and former governor of Georgia, stated, "Eric England was my career inspiration. By modeling after him, I achieved every success I have had in life".

References

External links
Sniper Central

1933 births
2018 deaths
American military snipers
United States Marine Corps non-commissioned officers
United States Distinguished Marksman
United States Marine Corps personnel of the Vietnam War
People from Union County, Georgia